Monterrosa is a surname. Notable people with the surname include:

Abraham Monterrosa (born 1975), Salvadoran footballer
Domingo Monterrosa (born 1984), Salvadoran military commander
Marvin Monterrosa (born 1991), Salvadoran footballer
Sean Monterrosa (1998–2020), American shooting victim of the Vallejo police department